Dudley Leslie (1905–1998) was a British screenwriter and playwright. He was on the jury for the 1958 Cannes Film Festival.

He co-wrote the 1948 play The Human Touch with J. Lee Thompson. He was married to the writer Audrey Erskine-Lindop with whom he collaborated a number of times.

Selected filmography
 Sensation (1936)
 Living Dangerously (1936)
 A Star Fell from Heaven (1936)
 Glamorous Night (1937)
 Jane Steps Out (1938)
 Marigold (1938)
 Black Limelight (1938)
 Housemaster (1938)
 Star of the Circus (1938)
 Oh Boy! (1938)
 Hell's Cargo (1939)
 The Outsider (1939)
 Three Silent Men (1940)
 Golden Madonna (1949)
 The Tall Headlines (1952)
 The Rough and the Smooth (1959)

Plays
 Between Us Two (1935)
 The Human Touch (1948)
 Let's Talk Turkey (1954)
 Beware of Angels (1959)

References

Bibliography 
 Wearing, J.P. The London Stage 1940-1949: A Calendar of Productions, Performers, and Personnel.  Rowman & Littlefield, 2014.

External links 
 

1905 births
1998 deaths
People from London
British writers
20th-century British screenwriters